Sukamulya is a district located in the Tangerang Regency of Banten in Java, Indonesia.

Tangerang Regency
Districts of Banten
Populated places in Banten